Chancellorsville may refer to:

 Chancellorsville, Virginia, United States, an unincorporated community
 Battle of Chancellorsville (1863) in the American Civil War
 Chancellorsville (game), a two-player wargame
 , a US Navy guided missile cruiser